The Tarso Voon is a  high stratovolcano in the north of the Republic of Chad. It is located in the western center of the Tibesti Mountains.
 
The summit of the mountain is dominated by the  relatively flat caldera. Extensive basaltic flows lie on the northeastern side in a 180-degree arc and are a result of the high activity in the Quaternary. Deposits from pyroclastic clouds are found  around the caldera. The mountain was constructed over a basement of Precambrian schists.
 
The active fumaroles, mudpots and hot springs are visited by the people of the Tibesti for medical purposes.

See also
 List of volcanoes in Chad

References

Tibesti Mountains
Mountains of Chad
Volcanoes of Chad
Holocene stratovolcanoes
Calderas of Chad